Vladimir Hachinski  is a Canadian clinical neuroscientist and researcher based at the Schulich School of Medicine and Dentistry at Western University. He is also a Senior Scientist at London's Robarts Research Institute. His research pertains in the greatest part to stroke and dementia,  the interactions between them and their joint prevention. He and John W. Norris helped to establish the world's first successful stroke unit at Sunnybrook Hospital in Toronto, and, by extension, helped cement stroke units as the standard of care for stroke patients everywhere. He discovered that the control of the heart by the brain is asymmetric, the fight/flight (sympathetic) response being controlled by the right hemisphere and the rest and digest (parasympathetic) response being controlled by the left hemisphere and damage to one key component (the insula) can lead to heart irregularities and sudden death. This discovery has added fundamental knowledge to how the brain controls the heart and blood pressure and lays the foundation for helping prevent sudden death.

Hachinski has held many prominent positions in the global neurology community, including editor-in-chief of the journal Stroke the leading publication in the field and president of the World Federation of Neurology and founder of World Brain Alliance. He is a Fellow of the Royal Society of Canada (FRSC) and the Canadian Academy of Health Sciences (FCAHS), a Member of the Orders of Ontario and Canada, and the recipient of several national and international awards and recognitions for his research and advocacy.

Early life, education, and early career
Hachinski was born in Zhytomyr, Ukraine, the eldest of three children. He moved with his family to Caripito, Venezuela as a child. The family moved to Port Perry, Ontario, Canada thereafter. He graduated from Port Perry High School a year later at the top of his class .

Hachinski received his MD in 1966 from the University of Toronto, and completed his residency in internal medicine and neurology in Toronto and Montreal, followed by a neurophysiology fellowship in Toronto. He received his formal accreditation in neurology as a Fellow of the Royal College of Physicians and Surgeons of Canada (FRCPC) in 1972. From 1973-74, a research fellowship with the Ontario Department of Health brought him to a cerebrovascular laboratory at the National Hospital for Nervous Diseases in London, England, and then to the Department of Clinical Physiology at Bispebjerg Hospital in Copenhagen, Denmark.

Following this, he returned to Toronto to take a staff position in the Department of Neurosciences at Sunnybrook Medical Centre, where he and Dr. John W. Norris established the MacLachlan Stroke Unit, Canada's first acute stroke unit. Hachinski remained at Sunnybrook until 1980, when he moved to London, Ontario to act as a neurology consultant for its major health centres: University Hospital, Victoria Hospital, St. Joseph's Hospital, and the London Psychiatric Hospital. He was hired concurrently as a professor at Western University (then called the University of Western Ontario). During this time (and until 1990), he also acted as Director of the Investigative Stroke Unit at London's University Hospital.

In 1987, he earned a Master of Science degree from McMaster University in Hamilton, Ontario, studying in the Department of Epidemiology and Biostatistics with a focus on design, measurement, and evaluation. The University of London’s highest earned degree, Doctor of Science (in Hachinski's case, in medicine), was conferred upon him in 1988 for his “contributions to migraine, stroke, and dementia.”

Research

Vascular cognitive impairment
At the beginning of Hachinski's career, the view prevailed that most dementias were caused by hardened brain arteries (mental deterioration via cerebral atherosclerosis). Hachinski showed in 1975 that, in fact, only a small minority of dementias were so-caused, and that most were “multi-infarct dementias” — dementias caused by multiple, small, often imperceptible strokes. The terms “vascular dementia” and “vascular cognitive impairment” would later be widely adopted to describe all cognitive impairments "with a vascular component" in order to distinguish them from primary degenerative dementia (i.e., Alzheimer disease and senile dementia) and to emphasize that they are preventable and treatable, insofar as their vascular causes (i.e., atherosclerosis, stroke, etc.) are treatable as well. He has offered an explanation for the origin of some of these lesions and associated symptoms through his concept of ambibaric brain.  He postulates that the brain has two complementary blood pressure systems, one high and one low and disturbances in each lead to different types of preventable lesions.

At the time, the prevalent view that dementia ensued from the slow strangulation of the brain's blood supply by hardening of the arteries spawned a whole industry of brain vessel “vasodilators”.  He showed that brain blood vessels in dementia were not “hardened” and that “vasodilators” were not only expensive but useless.  He also developed an eponymic “ischemic score” that continues to be widely used to identify the vascular (treatable and preventable) component of dementia. Successfully distinguishing between the two is tremendously important for patient prognosis, as treating the vascular causes of dementias can mitigate their effects. The scale is a prolifically cited tool, and has since been validated and optimized for use outside of clinical research settings.

In 1986, the journal, Archives of Neurology published a series of papers by Hachinski, Harold Merskey and colleagues on the rarefaction of white matter in the brains of elderly people. These papers were among the first to recognize the importance of white matter lesions as risks for stroke and dementia. Rarefaction of white matter in the brain had already been shown to be correlated with a wide variety of health problems, but these papers were groundbreaking for two reasons especially: First, they introduced the term, “leukoaraiosis,” a word derived by Hachinski, Paul Potter and Harold Merskey to etymologically and Hippocratically describe the rarefaction; and second, they specifically highlighted a previously underappreciated relationship between vascular risk factors for cognitive impairment (i.e., treatable and preventable risk factors for both stroke and multi-infarct dementia) and leukoaraiosis. By coining “leukoaraiosis,” Hachinski drew medical practitioners’ attention to these white matter hypodensities in the brains of patients affected by small strokes.

Hachinski continued to develop and promote his novel approach to dementia — viewing it as a product of preventable and treatable vascular problems, thus itself also amenable to prevention, delay, and mitigation — eventually coining it as the “vascular cognitive impairment approach” to dementias in 1994. This proactive and preventative, rather than solely retroactive and treatment-based approach included other novel coinages, such as “brain at risk,” describing patients without cognitive impairment but with risk factors for it.

Even with these developments, available diagnostic criteria for dementias continued to present a challenge, as they were not able to capture the complex, interactive, and adaptive nature of brain pathologies leading to dementia. For this reason, in 2006, Hachinski decided to lead (with Gabrielle LeBlanc) the development of core common standards to describe the clinical, neuropsychological, imaging, genetic, and neuropathological features of cognitive impairment. This standardization has allowed for ongoing improvement of the diagnostic criteria with new knowledge, comparison of results from different studies, and analysis & meta-analysis using “big data” techniques.

Acute stroke
The MacLachlan Stroke Unit at Sunnybrook, Canada's first stroke unit (est. 1975), was almost 20 years ahead of its time; stroke units have been considered the most effective treatment for stroke patients of all ages, severities, and types only since the 1990s. Hachinski and Norris' early work with that unit and others helped to cement the importance of dedicated wards for stroke patient monitoring and treatment, but his research over the next 17 years also shaped how those treatments and monitoring methods are executed.

In 1986, while he was Director of the Investigative Stroke Unit at University Hospital in London, he developed (with Robert Coté), the Canadian Neurological Scale – a simple but systematic tool, usable by non-physicians for evaluating and monitoring the neurological status of patients with acute stroke. Later, in 1992, he (with collaborators David Cechetto and Stephen Oppenheimer) began work to explore possible mechanisms for observed increases in catecholamines, cardiac enzymes, arrhythmias, and sudden death following acute stroke. This would eventually lead to the discovery that the insula of the brain is the mediator of these various cardiac complications. Knowing this alters doctors to monitor the heart closely, to prevent sudden death.

The scientific bases for preventing stroke and dementia together have been summarized by an international panel of experts.

Since stroke, heart disease and dementia represent risks for each other and share the same risk and protective factors, he advocates preventing this “Triple Threat” together.

He leads a multidisciplinary team studying for the first time together environmental, socioeconomic and individual risk and protective factors in the joint prevention of stroke, heart disease and dementia.

He is a participant in an initiative to make brain health the top priority.  He has offered a definition of brain health based on the World Health Organization definition of health” “A state of complete physical, mental and social well-being through a full, balanced, continuous development and exercise of the brain or in lay terms "Brain health is when thinking, feeling and connecting are the best that they can be in a sage, healthy environment."

Stroke prevention
In addition to his interest in the mechanisms of stroke and best practices for treatment, Hachinski also has a keen research interest in stroke prevention. He acted as the principal neurological investigator on several seminal, multicentre studies, beginning with the Canadian-American Ticlopidine study (1983–88) and the Extracranial/Intracranial Arterial Bypass Surgery trial (1983–87). The former showed a preventative advantage to the drug Ticlopidine over commonly-prescribed Aspirin, while the latter showed that the increasingly popular and very expensive EC/IC arterial bypass procedure did not significantly reduce the risk of ischemic stroke.

In 2003, alongside several other researchers, Hachinski began a proof of principle study through the Canadian Stroke Network on secondary stroke prevention. The study aimed to explore the efficacy of stroke risk-factor counselling and monitoring in effecting lifestyle changes and prescription adherence in patients, as well as exploring barriers and testing possible solutions to effective stroke risk-factor management. The preliminary results were extremely promising, showing that the addition of non-medical personnel to usual stroke care results in far better outcomes and reduced risk-factors. That initial study led to the creation of a multi-centre study in 2009 under the direction of Richard Chan.

Population health
Hachinski's home province of Ontario, Canada introduced a formal Provincial Stroke System in 2000. At the time, Hachinski hypothesized that this increased attention to stroke care would result not only in decreased incidence of stroke, but also in some dementias, since they share most of the same treatable risk factors. The prediction was correct, and he is therefore advocating a strategy of preventing some dementias through the prevention of stroke. With his colleagues, he showed, for the first time, a concomitant decrease in the incidence of stroke and dementia at a whole-population level. He is leading a team from 5 Western University faculties, 5 provinces and 4 countries, to find out how and help apply the lessons widely.

He advocates and will help implement a new approach to the joint prevention of stroke, ischemic heart disease and dementia (the terrible three).

The new approach is based on these premises:

1. The “terrible three” inflict the highest number of death and disability adjusted life years (DALY’s) globally. However, they share the same treatable and preventable risk factors and represent risks for each other. Consequently, conditions that occur together should be prevented together.

2. To be effective prevention has to occur in “actionable units” small enough that their members have or can develop a sense of community.

3. The approach has to be:

  a. Comprehensive – meaning that all relevant factors need to be considered: Environment, socio-economic factors and individual risk and protective factors

  b. Customized – to address the main and manageable problems

  c. Cost-effective – to justify why it should be done ahead of other priorities

This approach is known as the CCCAP or the 3C’s approach.

Additionally, he advocates a change in strategy. Instead of using fear, warning people that if they don’t lead a healthy lifestyle they will suffer a stroke, heart disease or dementia decades later, the aim is to achieve brain/mental health now. The basics are relatively simple and can be added into most people’s lives. Additionally, in the increasingly digital age and the knowledge-based economy, it has become a requirement. In fact, brain/mental health is the key to health, productivity and well-being.

Key administrative positions and advocacy
Hachinski has held numerous high-level administrative positions in the medical community during his career.
2015 led the development of a Proclamation about the joint prevention of stroke and dementia, endorsed by all the major international organizations dealing with both. Since then leading the effort to implement the Proclamation on behalf of the World Stroke Organization.
2011–2013: Founding chair, World Brain Alliance a collection of the most important international organizations promoting brain/mental health and reducing brain/mental health disorders, founded on three premises:
 There is no health without brain health
 Brain health begins with the mother's and the child's education
 Our brains are our future
Knowledge accrues in pieces but is understood in patterns
God may forgive our sins, but our bodies hold grudges
We need fewer watch dogs and more hunting dogs
We need not only rising stars, but North Stars
2010-13 : President, World Federation of Neurology (WFN; international body representing world neurology); first Canadian in its six decades history
2006-10: Vice President (North America), WFN
2000-10: Editor-in-Chief, Stroke He introduced 9 international editions and a unique mentorship program for authors of developing countries.
2008-12 : Vice President, World Stroke Organization
2004-06: Led working group to develop World Stroke Agenda (2004, Vancouver) and World Stroke Day Proclamation (2006, Cape Town), observed every October 29.

Non-scientific publications

Popular (medicine)
Hachinski's primary popular medicine contributions have been publications in cooperation with his son, Vladimir, and daughter, Larissa. With Vladimir, he published an article in the Journal of the Canadian Medical Association called, "Music and the Brain" in August 1994. With Larissa, he published the book, Stroke: A Comprehensive Guide to Brain Attack in 2003. Coining and employing the term “brain attack,” the book was written to increase public awareness of the importance of adequate stroke care and early intervention.

Medical historical
An interest in the history of medicine has led Hachinski to publish several articles on the subject over the course of his career:

 "H.J.M Barnett: a biographical sketch." "Modern Neurosurgical Giants" Ed: Bucy PC. Elsevier, New York, pp. 35–38, 1986.
"Transient cerebral ischemia: a historical sketch." In: Historical Aspects of the Neurosciences. (Eds) Rose FC, Bynum WF. Raven Press, New York, pp. 185–193, 1982.

Arts and humanities
In addition to his medical research, Hachinski is also respectably accomplished in poetry, music, and history (including history of medicine). He possesses an honours degree in history from the University of London, UK, is a Corresponding Member of the North American Academy of the Spanish Language (a corresponding academy of the Royal Spanish Academy) and has published a poetry anthology, Resonancias, in Spanish under the pen name Alejandro Aranda. In addition, "Dream Waltz," composed by Hachinski and orchestrated by Jason Stanford (Professor of Theory and Composition at Western University), premiered at the Musikverein in Vienna, Austria by the Brno Philharmoniker on September 24, 2013. Finally, he is fond of coining slogans and aphorisms:
“Building bridges to a healthy future” (used for fundraising by the London Health Sciences Centre Foundation, London, Canada)
“There is no health without brain health” the original first premise of the World Brain Alliance  that he founded.
“Information grows exponentially, knowledge more slowly and wisdom not at all”.

Honours and recognition

Awards/recognitions
Over the course of his career, Hachinski has been the recipient of many awards and recognitions in his field. The most notable and significant are outlined below.
2022: The Potamkin Prize for Research in Pick's, Alzheimer's, and Related Diseases (“The Alzheimer’s Nobel”)
2021: The World Federation of Neurology Medal for “Services to World Neurology”
2021: The 41st T.S. Srinivasan Oration and gold medal and scroll
2020: Distinguished Inaugural Lecture at the foundation of the African Stroke Organization
2020: The American Academy of Neurology Wartenberg Lecture & Award
2020: Awarded one of the Canadian Medical Association's F.N.G. Starr Award.
2018: Awarded the Killam Prize in health sciences.
2018: Induction into the Canadian Medical Hall of Fame. https://www.youtube.com/watch?v=8x3vm-5BUmw
2017: Prince Mahidol Award in the field of Public Health,
2016: The McLaughlin Medal of the Royal Society of Canada for “research of sustained excellence in medical science”
2015: Scientist Career Award, Lawson Health Research Institute
2014: Fellowship in the Royal Society of Canada
2014: Karolinska Stroke Award for Excellence in Stroke Research
2013: Chancellor's Award Lecture in Neuroscience and Neurology, University of Louisiana
2013: Queen Elizabeth II Diamond Jubilee Medal
2012: Order of Ontario
2010: Ontario Premier's Discovery Award in life sciences and medicine
2010: Biomedical Science Ambassador Award, Partners In Research
2010: International Bial Merit Award in Medical Sciences
2010: Leadership in Stroke Medicine Award, World Stroke Organization
2008: Member of the Order of Canada
2006: Distinguished University Professor, Western University
2005: Fellowship in the Canadian Academy of Health Sciences
2005: Thomas Willis Award, American Stroke Association
2000: Mihara Award in research on cerebrovascular disorders
1990: Ontario Trillium Clinical Scientist Award
1989: Featured in Canadian Who’s Who

Honorary degrees
Hachinski holds four honorary doctorates. The first, Doctor of Medicine honoris causa from the University of Salamanca, Spain (the oldest university of the Spanish speaking world) was awarded in 2000. This was followed by Doctor of the University honoris causa from the University of Buenos Aires, Argentina (2005), Doctor of Medicine honoris causa from the University of Cordoba, Argentina (2007), and Doctor honoris causa from the Russian Academy of Medical Sciences (2012).

References

Canadian neuroscientists
Living people
Year of birth missing (living people)
Ukrainian emigrants to Canada
Members of the Order of Canada
Members of the Order of Ontario
Fellows of the Royal College of Physicians and Surgeons of Canada
People from Scugog
Fellows of the Royal Society of Canada